The Israel Stuttering Association (AMBI) is a public non-profit charitable organization that supports people who stutter and their families in Israel.

The association seeks to enhance public knowledge about stuttering, runs self-help groups, and promotes affordable treatment for people who stutter. It also organizes conferences and meetings for people who stutter, speech language therapists, and anyone interested in stuttering.

, the association is chaired by Hanan Hurwitz. It publishes a journal: OutLoud (Hebrew title: Bekol Ram).

AMBI is a member of the European League of Stuttering Associations and the International Stuttering Association.

See also
 Cluttering
 Stuttering therapy

References

External links 
 

1999 establishments in Israel
Charities based in Israel
Disability organizations based in Israel
Mental health organizations in Israel
Organizations based in Tel Aviv
Stuttering associations